Mateo Romero (born 1966) is a Native American painter. He was born in Berkeley, California, and is a member of the Cochiti Pueblo.

Background
Mateo Romero was born on December 9, 1966. His father, Santiago Romero was a Southern Keresan Cochiti artist. His mother is Nellie Guth, a European-American. His father's mother,  Teresita Chavez Romero, was a traditional ceramicist, known for her seated clay figurines and  functional jars or ollas. Mateo's Indian name is He-tse-tewa or "War Shield."

Art career
Romero attended Dartmouth College, Hanover, New Hampshire and studied under Varujan Boghosian and Frank Moss.  He briefly attended the Institute of American Indian Arts. At the University of New Mexico in Albuquerque, Romero earned his MFA Degree in printmaking. At the School for Advanced Research, he furthered his painting techniques as a Dubin Fellow in 2002. In 2008, he was chosen to be the SWAIA Indian Market poster artist.

Mateo began painting narrative scenes providing social commentary on contemporary Pueblo life. Subject matter for his paintings falls into four categories: "Addictions," "Indian Gaming," "Bonnie and Clyde," and "Voices at Wounded Knee," according to writer Gregory Schaaf, PhD. He moved towards mixed media and began working with historical photographs his "Dancers" series, which employs a technique he personally invented that incorporates asphalt into the surface.

Romero's work was part of Stretching the Canvas: Eight Decades of Native Painting (2019–21), a survey at the National Museum of the American Indian George Gustav Heye Center in New York.

Personal
Romero lives in Pojoaque Pueblo with his wife, Melissa, and their three children, Rain, Povi, and Erik. His brother, Diego Romero is also a successful artist.

References

Collections
Peabody Essex Museum

External links
Mateo Romero, Vision Project, by Jessica R. Metcalfe
Peabody Essex Museum

1966 births
Painters from New Mexico
Dartmouth College alumni
Living people
Native American painters
Institute of American Indian Arts alumni
Pueblo artists
Academy of Art University alumni
20th-century Native Americans
21st-century Native Americans